Marco Zappacosta (born 1985) is an American entrepreneur. He co-founded Thumbtack and serves as the company's CEO.

Biography 
Zappacosta was born in Stanford, California in 1985 and grew up in Menlo Park, California. His father is Pierluigi Zappacosta, an Italian engineer who emigrated to the United States in the 1970s and co-founded Logitech. He is bilingual and speaks Italian.

Zappacosta attended Columbia University, graduating in 2007 with a bachelor's degree in political science. During college, Zappacosta was the director of Students for Saving Social Security (S4) in Washington, D.C., a group representing the student voice in the Social Security debate, with more than 10,000 student members in over 300 campus chapters nationwide.

He later came up with the idea of creating an online marketplace matching service providers and their customers. In 2008, he launched Thumbtack with two of his fellow S4 directors Jonathan Swanson and Jeremy Tunnell, as well as Sander Daniels.

In the early years, Zappacosta and his team were scrapping Craigslist and built an online directory of verified service providers with their photos, license, and reviews. The idea appealed to angel investor Jason Calacanis, who became the first person to invest in the startup.

Zappacosta led the company to develop and launch an instant matching feature that automates and streamlines the booking process between customers and professionals, a process taking nine years and 25 million requests from Thumbtack's over 1,000 categories of jobs.

As of 2021, Thumbtack has a $3.2 billion valuation and has the highest number of professional listings, followed by Yelp.

References 

Living people
People from Stanford, California
American company founders
American chief executives
Columbia College (New York) alumni
Businesspeople in information technology
American people of Italian descent
1985 births